V (Roman numeral for five) is the fifth studio album by American band Maroon 5. The album was released on August 29, 2014, through 222 and Interscope Records. V was Maroon 5's first album to be released through Interscope after the band's previous label, A&M Octone Records, transferred them along with most of its artists to Interscope. The album also saw the return of keyboardist/rhythm guitarist/backing vocalist Jesse Carmichael, after his absence from recording, touring and promoting the band's previous album, Overexposed, which was released in 2012. It debuted at number one on the US Billboard 200 and produced with three hit singles, "Maps", "Animals", and "Sugar", peaking at numbers 6, 3 and 2 on the US Billboard Hot 100, respectively. A fourth single "This Summer's Gonna Hurt like a Motherfucker", was released on May 15, 2015, from the reissue deluxe edition of the album. "Feelings" was released as the album's fifth and final single on September 14, 2015.

Background and production 
In 2012, Maroon 5 released their fourth studio album Overexposed. The record was released during a time of commercial momentum for the band following the success of "Moves like Jagger" (recorded with Christina Aguilera), a single which lead singer Adam Levine credited as having "revived the group", and the album's lead single, "Payphone", which became both a critical and commercial success. Overexposed was described by the band as their "most poppiest [sic] record to date", with critics giving the album mixed reviews upon its release.

V was recorded by the band at Conway Studios in downtown Los Angeles, California, over a year-long period from 2013 through to mid 2014. The recording sessions for V saw the band's keyboardist Jesse Carmichael return to the band after a two-year hiatus, which saw him absent during the recording and promotion for Overexposed. The album also features a collaboration with Gwen Stefani called "My Heart Is Open", co-written with Australian singer Sia. Guitarist James Valentine, stated that the band has known Furler for a long time and working with her was "really cool".

Artwork 
The album cover for V was created by South Korean photographer Lee Jung. It features a 1.3m neon lighted crosstube formed in the shape of the roman numeral for five, the title of the album. The red neon display is placed in front of a reservoir in the Gyeonggi Province, with mountains in the background. The Maroon 5 logo appears out of focus in the background as a sign perched on the side of the mountain, similar to the famous Hollywood Sign. An alternate cover for the album was created by Indonesian graphic designer Bayo Gale (who won the band's alternate album cover art contest). It features the tiger's face with a shape of the letter V with a vertex at the bottom and the Maroon 5 logo.

Release and promotion 
Departing from then-active A&M Octone Records, the band signed with its related label, Interscope Records and frontman Levine's record label 222 Records to release the album. V was unveiled by the band and Interscope on May 19, 2014, slated for a release date of September 2, 2014, in the United States. Through a signed contract with Live Nation, the band had also announced that they are also set to embark on a world tour in late 2014 through to early 2015 in support of V.
The artwork for V was unveiled through a series of five puzzle piece clues released daily through the band's Facebook page from July 17 through to July 21. After the series was completed, the album's artwork, in addition to its track listing, were unveiled on July 21, 2014. The album also includes a limited-edition of ZinePak. Moreover, to promote the album, Maroon 5 performed at the iHeartRadio Theater in Burbank, California on August 26, 2014 and on The Today Show (as part of the Toyota concert series) at Rockefeller Plaza in New York City, New York on September 1. Later, the band started the Maroon V Tour in February 2015 at venues mainly to take place in North America and Europe. The tour ended on May 12, 2018, in Zapopan, Mexico, comprising 136 shows.

Singles 
"Maps" was released as the album's lead single on June 16, 2014. The song peaked at number 6 on the US Billboard Hot 100, giving the band their ninth top-ten hit in the country. "Maps" also reached the top-ten in an additional fourteen countries, including a peak of number 2 on the UK Singles Chart.

"Animals" was released as the album's second single on August 25, 2014. The song peaked at number 3 on the US Billboard Hot 100, giving the band their tenth top-ten hit in the country. The song also peaked within the top-ten in an additional ten countries, and has also sold in excess of 200,000 copies in the UK alone. Likewise with their previous single, "Animals" achieved platinum status in the US for sales exceeding 1,000,000 copies.

"Sugar" was released on January 13, 2015, as the album's third single. It is the most successful single from the album, reaching the top-ten in 24 countries, including number 6 in Australia, number 7 on the UK Singles Chart, and number two on the US Billboard Hot 100.

"This Summer's Gonna Hurt like a Motherfucker" was released on May 15, 2015, as the album's fourth single. Through it doesn’t appear on the standard edition, it is included on the album's reissue deluxe edition.

"Feelings" was sent to US contemporary hit and adult contemporary radio on September 14, 2015, served as the album's fifth and final single.

Promotional single 
"It Was Always You" was released on July 29, 2014, as the first and only promotional single of the album. The song peaked at number 40 on the UK Singles Chart and number 45 on the US Billboard Hot 100.

Critical reception 

The album received generally mixed reviews upon its release. On Metacritic, V received a weighted average score of 55/100 based on 12 reviews, indicating "mixed or average reviews". In a four-star review, Jon Dolan of Rolling Stone called the songs "precision-tuned and lustrously polished, jammed with hooks and choruses that build a man cave in your brain." Brian Mansfield of USA Today gave the album two and a half stars out of four, remarking the album was "easy to digest and contains all sorts of flavors while still being its own thing." In an 86 out of 100 review for Billboard, Brad Wete argued the album "reveals that their foundation has not been removed." Writing on behalf of AllMusic, Stephen Thomas Erlewine rated the album three and a half stars out of five, praising the band for "[embracing] the tuneful, slightly soulful adult contemporary pop band they've always been".

In a mixed review, Kyle Anderson of Entertainment Weekly graded the album a C, suggesting Levine's songwriting didn't "live up to his ability to work a crowd." Writing for The Guardian, Tim Jonze gave the album two out of five stars, dismissing it as "evidence as to why most people can't remember a Maroon 5 song two seconds after it finishes." In a two star review from The Observer, Theo Leanse called the album "a gaudy chunk of over-produced electro-pop-rock", but noted its accessibility, saying it "flips a smug V-sign at us, knowing we'll never free its singles from our skulls." But, Kathy Iandoli of Idolator gave the album 4 out of 5 stars and called the album "lives up to that formula of big songs while never faltering, for better or for worse".

Evan Rytlewski gave a C+ review on behalf of The A.V. Club commenting the band "stayed hip", but only by "furnishing a too-perfect, soundstage ideal of whatever the kids are into these days." In the New York Daily News, Jim Farber criticized the hooks on the album for being "so annoying, you won't be able to scrub them from your mind." Annie Galvin delivered a 5/10 review for PopMatters stating, "As far as lightweight, easy-listening charts pop goes, V doesn't totally offend the sensibilities, and that's surely more than can be said about some of Maroon 5's overly pandering, less exploratory 'pop-rock' peers."

Commercial performance 
In the United States, the album debuted at number one on the Billboard 200, with first week sales of 164,000 copies and earned their second US number-one album and their first since 2007's It Won't Be Soon Before Long. As of August 2015, it has sold over one million copies in the US.

In Canada, the album also debuted at number one on the Canadian Albums Chart, with 15,000 copies sold for the week. In its second week, the album remained at number one with 7,700 copies.

Track listing 

Notes
  signifies an additional producer
  signifies a vocal producer
  signifies that "This Summer's Gonna Hurt like a Motherfucker" is also known as "This Summer" in other countries
  signifies a remixer

Personnel 
Credits for V are adapted from AllMusic.

Maroon 5
 
 Adam Levine – lead and backing vocals, additional drums, songwriting 
 Jesse Carmichael – keyboards, synthesizers, piano, backing vocals, rhythm guitar (track 12) 
 Mickey Madden – bass guitar 
 James Valentine – lead guitar, backing vocals 
 Matt Flynn – drums, percussion 
 PJ Morton – keyboards, synthesizers, piano, backing vocals 

Additional musicians

 Sam Schamberg – additional handclaps and backing vocals
 Jason Fields – additional handclaps and backing vocals
 Travis Leete – additional handclaps and backing vocals
 Shawn Tellez – additional handclaps and backing vocals
 Shellback – songwriting, production, additional instrumentation, backing vocals, programming
 Sam Farrar – backing vocals, programming
 Ashley Cahill – backing vocals
 Ryan Jackson-Healy – backing vocals
 Ross Golan – backing vocals, songwriting
 Johan Carlsson – songwriting, additional instrumentation, keyboards, mixing, production, programming, vocal production, backing vocals
 Mattias Bylund – strings
 Dr. Luke – instrumentation, programming, drums, guitar, keyboards, percussion, programming, synth bass
 Ammo & Cirkut – additional instrumentation and programming
 Mike Posner – additional vocals, composer
 Stargate – additional instrumentation, production, programming
 Aryn Wüthrich – backing vocals
 Astma & Rocwell – additional instrumentation and programming
 The Monsters and the Strangerz – songwriting, production, additional instrumentation
 Gwen Stefani – vocals (featured guest on "My Heart Is Open")
 Phil Peterson – strings

Technical
this list may be incomplete list of credits

 Ryan Tedder – songwriting, production, additional instrumentation, programming
 John Armstrong – assistant
 Astma – additional instrumentation, production, programming
 Tim Blacksmith – executive production
 Max Martin – executive production, vocal production
 Noah "Mailbox" Passovoy – production
 Benny Blanco – songwriting, production, additional instrumentation, programming
 Ammar Malik – songwriting
 Linda Carbone – publicity
 Tom Coyne – mastering
 Danny D. – executive producer
 Carleen Donovan – publicity
 Mikkel Storleer Eriksen – songwriting, engineer
 Jason Evigan – songwriting, additional instrumentation, production, programming, vocal production
 Eric Eylands – assistant
 Rachael Findlen – assistant
 Michel Flygare – songwriting, production
 Serban Ghenea – mixing
 Clint Gibbs – engineer
 Oscar Görres (OzGo) – songwriting, production, additional instrumentation, programming
 John Hanes – mixing
 Tor Erik Hermansen – songwriting
 Jacob Hindlin – songwriting
 Sia – songwriting
 Nate Ruess – songwriting
 Rodney "Darkchild" Jerkins – songwriting, production
 Andre Lindal – songwriting, production
 Joshua Coleman – songwriting, production
 Lee Jung – photography
 Seif "Mageef" Hussain – production coordination

Charts

Weekly charts

Year-end charts

Decade-end charts

Certifications and sales

Release history

References 

2014 albums
Maroon 5 albums
Albums produced by Benny Blanco
Albums produced by Max Martin
Albums produced by Shellback (record producer)
Albums produced by Ryan Tedder
222 Records albums
Interscope Records albums
Interscope Geffen A&M Records albums
Universal Music Group albums
Albums produced by Jason Evigan
Albums produced by Johan Carlsson